The Patcham Formation or Pachchham Formation is a Bathonian geologic formation of Patcham Island, Kutch district, Gujarat, India. Dinosaur remains are among the fossils that have been recovered from the formation, although none have yet been referred to a specific genus.

See also 
 List of dinosaur-bearing rock formations
 List of stratigraphic units with indeterminate dinosaur fossils

References

Bibliography 
 D. K. Srivastava, D. K. Pandey, A. Alberti and F. T. Fürsich. 2010. Record of Advenaster Hess, 1955 (Asteroidea) from the Bathonian Patcham Formation of Kala Jhar in Habo Dome, Kachchh Basin, India. Journal of the Palaeontological Society of India 55(1):65-69
  * S. K. Jana and S. S. Das. 2002. A report of a 157.8 m.y.-old dinosaur bone from the Jurassic marine Chari Formation, Kutch, Gujarat and its taphonomic significance. Current Science 82(1):85-88
 D. Mukherjee, S. Bardhan, and D. Ghosh. 2002. Significance of new species of Cryptorhynchia (Brachiopoda) from the Middle Jurassic of Kutch,India. Alcheringa 26:209-231
 D. Mehl and F. T. Fürsich. 1997. Middle Jurassic Porifera from Kachchh, western India. Paläontologische Zeitschrift 71:19-33
 F. T. Fürsich, D. K. Pandey, W. Oschmann, A.K. Jaitly, and I.B. Singh. 1994. Ecology and adaptive strategies of corals in unfavourable environments: Examples from the Middle Jurassic of the Kachchh Basin, western India. Neues Jahrbuch für Geologie und Paläontologie, Abhandlungen 194(2-3):269-303

Geologic formations of India
Jurassic System of Asia
Jurassic India
Bathonian Stage
Limestone formations
Shallow marine deposits
Paleontology in India
Geology of Gujarat